Gregg Renkes is an American politician, attorney, and lobbyist who served as the Alaska Attorney General from 2002 to 2005.  He is currently Senior Counsel with Van Ness Feldman, LLP.

Education 
Renkes earned a Bachelor of Science degree in environmental science from Vassar College, Master of Science from the Yale School of the Environment, and Juris Doctor from the University of Colorado Law School.

Career 
After a judicial clerkship in Alaska, Gregg Renkes served in the U.S. Senate in various capacities including Chief of Staff for Senator Frank Murkowski and Majority Staff Director for the Committee on Energy and Natural Resources. Mr. Renkes was Alaska’s fifteenth Attorney General where he increased the focus at the Department of Law on prosecuting crime and protecting and developing the state’s energy resource wealth. He also served as a member of the Exxon Valdez Oil Spill Trustee Council and the Alaska Permanent Fund Board. He was appointed Co-Chair of the Alaska Rural Justice and Law Enforcement Commission. His private practice has focused on matters relating to energy, public land, Alaska Native, and Federal Indian law. He has also worked as general counsel for a national commercial real estate and energy development company. 

Mr. Renkes most recently was appointed to the Interior Board of Land Appeals (IBLA) where he decided appeals from bureau decisions relating to the use and disposition of public lands and their resources, mineral resources on the Outer Continental Shelf, and the conduct of surface coal mining operations under the Surface Mining Control and Reclamation Act. Prior to joining the IBLA, he held the positions of Senior Counselor to the Secretary and Deputy Chief of Staff for Policy at the U.S. Department of the Interior where he developed and led the execution of policy priorities and regulatory initiatives through departmental, inter-agency and executive processes and reviewed all matters requiring secretarial action.

References 

20th-century American lawyers
21st-century American lawyers
Alaska Republicans
Alaska Attorneys General
Living people
Year of birth missing (living people)
Vassar College alumni
University of Colorado Law School alumni
Yale University alumni